This is a list of the locations for former Royal Observer Corps (ROC) Group Headquarters and the United Kingdom Warning and Monitoring Organisation (UKWMO) sector controls that received information from ROC posts by dedicated  GPO/BT landlines. Clusters of posts also had VHF radio communications with HQs and sector controls, in case of land-line failure, from the cluster Master Posts.

The Royal Observer Corps was a civil defence organisation operating in the United Kingdom between 29 October 1925 and 31 December 1995, when the Corps' civilian volunteers were stood down. (ROC headquarters staff at RAF Bentley Priory stood down on 31 March 1996). Composed mainly of civilian spare-time volunteers, ROC personnel wore a Royal Air Force (RAF) style uniform and latterly came under the administrative control of RAF Strike Command and the operational control of the Home Office. Civilian volunteers were trained and administered by a small cadre of professional full-time officers under the command of the Commandant Royal Observer Corps; latterly a serving RAF Air Commodore.

ROC Group Headquarters
ROC Group No 1 - Maidstone
ROC Group No 2 - Horsham
ROC Group No 3 - Oxford
ROC Group No 4 - Colchester
ROC Group No 5 - Watford
ROC Group No 6 - Norwich
ROC Group No 7 - Bedford
ROC Group No 8 - Coventry
ROC Group No 9 - Yeovil
ROC Group No 10 - Exeter
ROC Group No 11 - Truro
ROC Group No 12 - Bristol
ROC Group No 13 - South Wales
ROC Group No 14 - Winchester
ROC Group No 15 - Lincoln - (RAF Fiskerton)
ROC Group No 16 - Shrewsbury
ROC Group No 17 - North Wales (RAF Wrexham)
ROC Group No 18 - Leeds
ROC Group No 19 - Manchester
ROC Group No 20 - York
ROC Group No 21 - Preston (Goosnargh)
ROC Group No 22 - Carlisle (RAF Carlisle)
ROC Group No 23 - Durham
ROC Group No 24 - Edinburgh (RAF Turnhouse)
1953 - 1964 Barnton Quarry
ROC Group No 25 - Ayr
ROC Group No 27 - Oban
ROC Group No 28 - Dundee
ROC Group No 29 - Aberdeen
ROC Group No 30 - Inverness
ROC Group No 31 - Belfast (Thiepval Barracks)
1954-1959 Castlereagh, Belfast

UKWMO Sectors and groups
Metropolitan sector
1 Group - Maidstone (group headquarters at Ashmore House, Maidstone)
2 Group - Horsham (sector headquarters)
3 Group - Oxford (peacetime national headquarters)
4 Group - Colchester
14 Group - Winchester
Midlands sector
6 Group - Norwich (group headquarters at Old Catton)
7 Group - Bedford 
8 Group - Coventry (group headquarters at Lawford Heath)
15 Group - Lincoln (group and sector headquarters at RAF Fiskerton) 
20 Group - York (group headquarters at Acomb)
Southern sector
9 Group - Yeovil
10 Group - Exeter (group headquarters at Poltimore Park)
12 Group - Bristol (group and sector headquarters at Lansdown, Bath)
13 Group - Carmarthen 
Western sector
16 Group - Shrewsbury 
17 Group - Wrexham (group headquarters at RAF Wrexham)
21 Group - Preston (sector headquarters - wartime national headquarters)
22 Group - Carlisle (group headquarters at RAF Carlisle)
31 Group - Belfast (group headquarters at Thiepval Barracks)
Caledonian sector
24 Group - Edinburgh (group headquarters at RAF Turnhouse)
25 Group - Ayr
28 Group - Dundee (group headquarters at Craigiebarns)
1964 - 1976 School Hill, Aberdeenshire
29 Group - Aberdeen (group headquarters at Northfield)
30 Group - Inverness (group headquarters at Raigmore)

See also
Commandant Royal Observer Corps
Aircraft recognition
Royal Observer Corps Monitoring Post
Operational instruments of the Royal Observer Corps
AWDREY
Bomb Power Indicator
Ground Zero Indicator
Fixed Survey Meter
United Kingdom Warning and Monitoring Organisation
Four-minute warning
Royal Observer Corps Medal
Skywatch march
RAF Bentley Priory
List of Royal Observer Corps / United Kingdom Warning and Monitoring Organisation Posts (A-E)
List of Royal Observer Corps / United Kingdom Warning and Monitoring Organisation Posts (F-K)
List of Royal Observer Corps / United Kingdom Warning and Monitoring Organisation Posts (L-P)
List of Royal Observer Corps / United Kingdom Warning and Monitoring Organisation Posts (Q-Z)

Notes

External links
Nuclear Monitoring Posts – Subterranea Britannica

 *
1925 establishments in the United Kingdom
Military units and formations established in 1941
Military units and formations disestablished in 1995
Obs
Cold War military equipment of the United Kingdom
Cold War military history of the United Kingdom
Emergency management in the United Kingdom
Military units and formations of the Royal Air Force in World War II